Two Hearts Among the Beasts (Italian: Due cuori fra le belve) is a 1943 Italian comedy film directed by Giorgio Simonelli and starring Totò, Vera Carmi and Enrico Glori. A dancing master takes part in an expedition to Africa find a missing anthropologist whose daughter he is in love with.

The film's sets were designed by Alberto Boccianti. It was shot at Cinecittà in Rome.

Plot 
An important Italian scientist disappears in the Jungle, and his niece Laura sets off to find him. Toto, dance teacher, ends up in the wrong steamer trip, and discovers that the companions of the niece have a sinister plan: kidnap her. The ship, however, is shipwrecked on the island of the Jungle, and Toto is worshiped as a god by the natives, and is then received by the dispersed scientist, who sees him as "the missing link in the evolutionary chain of mankind".

Cast

References

Bibliography
 Parish, James Robert. Film Actors Guide. Scarecrow Press, 1977.

External links

1943 films
1943 comedy films
Italian comedy films
1940s Italian-language films
Films directed by Giorgio Simonelli
Films shot at Cinecittà Studios
Italian black-and-white films
1940s Italian films